The Djibouti national handball team is the national handball team of Djibouti.

African Championship record
1992 – 8th place
1994 – 10th place

References

External links
IHF profile

Men's national handball teams
National sports teams of Djibouti